Argyle is an unincorporated community and census-designated place in Boone and Winnebago counties in the U.S. state of Illinois, northeast of Rockford. It is part of the Rockford, Illinois Metropolitan Statistical Area.

Geography 
Argyle is located at  (42.3600186, -88.9401049), at an altitude of 833 feet (269 m).

Demographics
As of the 2020 census there were 332 people, 128 households, and 128 families residing in the CDP. The racial makeup of the CDP was 88.86% White, 0.60% Asian, 0.00% Pacific Islander, 2.41% from other races, and 8.13% from two or more races. Hispanic or Latino of any race were 4.82% of the population.

There were 128 households, out of which 65.63% had children under the age of 18 living with them, and all were married couples living together. The average household size was 2.76 and the average family size was 2.76.

The CDP's age distribution consisted of 23.8% under the age of 18, 5.9% from 18 to 24, 16.7% from 25 to 44, 47.9% from 45 to 64, and 5.7% who were 65 years of age or older. The median age was 48.5 years. For every 100 females, there were 111.4 males. For every 100 females age 18 and over, there were 103.8 males.

The median income for a household in the CDP was $139,821, and the median income for a family was $139,821. Males had a median income of $62,450 versus $26,042 for females. The per capita income for the CDP was $51,234. None of the population was below the poverty line.

History
Argyle was named by an early settler who was a native of Argyll, in Scotland.

Argyle was hit by the November 22, 2010 tornado that affected Northern Illinois and Southern Wisconsin. It was rated EF2 on the Enhanced Fujita Scale.

References

External links 
NACo

Unincorporated communities in Boone County, Illinois
Unincorporated communities in Winnebago County, Illinois
Unincorporated communities in Illinois
Rockford metropolitan area, Illinois
Census-designated places in Boone County, Illinois
Census-designated places in Winnebago County, Illinois
Census-designated places in Illinois